Corneliu is a Romanian given name, derived from Latin Cornelius. Corneliu may refer to:

Corneliu Baba
Corneliu Bogdan
Corneliu Calotescu
Corneliu Carp
Corneliu Chisu
Corneliu Ciontu
Corneliu Zelea Codreanu
Corneliu Codreanu (footballer) 
Corneliu Coposu
Corneliu Dragalina
Corneliu E. Giurgea
Corneliu Ion
Corneliu Ionescu
Corneliu Mănescu
Corneliu Moldovanu
Corneliu Oros
Corneliu Papură
Corneliu M. Popescu
Corneliu Porumboiu
Corneliu Robe
Corneliu Stroe
Corneliu Șumuleanu
Corneliu Teodorini
Corneliu Vadim Tudor

Romanian masculine given names